"Perdición" is a song recorded and performed by Spanish/Mexican pop rock group La 5ª Estación. The song is the second of three radio singles from the band's debut studio album, Primera Toma. An acoustic version was later released as a single for the band's Acústico (La 5ª Estación album) album.

References

La 5ª Estación songs
2002 singles
Songs written by Natalia Jiménez